Hilaire Bernard de La Rivière (c. 1640 –  1 December 1729) was a multi-faceted builder as well as a seigneurial attorney and notary in New France.

References

External links 
 

1640s births
1729 deaths
People of New France
Canadian architects
Canadian notaries